Prince Louis of Wales (Louis Arthur Charles; born 23 April 2018) is a member of the British royal family. He is the third and youngest child, as well as the second son, of William, Prince of Wales, and Catherine, Princess of Wales. A grandson of King Charles III, he is fourth in the line of succession to the British throne.

Birth
Prince Louis was born on 23 April 2018 in the Lindo Wing of St Mary's Hospital, London, at 11:01 BST (10:01 UTC), during the reign of his great-grandmother Queen Elizabeth II as the third child of the Duke and Duchess of Cambridge. On 24 April, gun salutes from the Tower of London and Hyde Park and bell ringings at Westminster Abbey marked the birth. On 27 April 2018, it was announced that the baby had been named Louis Arthur Charles, the first and last names honouring his paternal great-great-granduncle Louis, Lord Mountbatten, and his paternal grandfather, the Prince of Wales (later King Charles III), respectively.

Upbringing 
On 9 July 2018, Louis was christened by the Archbishop of Canterbury in the Chapel Royal at St James's Palace, using water from the River Jordan in accordance with tradition. His godparents are Nicholas van Cutsem, Guy Pelly, Harry Aubrey-Fletcher, Lady Laura Meade, Hannah Gillingham Carter, and Lucy Middleton. He wore the replica of the royal christening gown, created in 2008 as a copy of the 1841 gown made for Queen Victoria's eldest daughter Victoria, Princess Royal, and used for every royal christening until it was retired for preservation in 2004.

The family lived at Kensington Palace and Anmer Hall during Louis's early childhood, before moving to Adelaide Cottage in Windsor Home Park in 2022. On 8 September 2022, Queen Elizabeth II died and Louis's grandfather acceded as Charles III. As such, he became fourth in line to the throne. The next day, Louis's parents were made Prince and Princess of Wales, giving him the new title of "Prince Louis of Wales".

Education 
Louis started his education at the Willcocks Nursery School, near his family's home in Kensington Palace, in April 2021. He and his siblings began attending Lambrook, an independent preparatory school in Berkshire, in September 2022.

Official appearances
Louis made his first Trooping the Colour appearance on the balcony of Buckingham Palace on 8 June 2019. In March 2020, he joined his siblings, George and Charlotte, in an online video to applaud key workers during the coronavirus pandemic. In September 2020, the children met David Attenborough; Kensington Palace subsequently released a video of them asking Attenborough questions regarding environmental conservation. On 11 December 2020, they made their first red carpet appearance accompanying their parents to the London Palladium for a performance of a pantomime held to thank key workers for their efforts during the pandemic.

In June 2022, during his great-grandmother's Platinum Jubilee celebration weekend, Louis and his siblings made their debut in the Trooping the Colour carriage procession. The procession was followed by a flypast, during which all three Cambridge children joined their parents, the Queen, and other working royals on the Buckingham Palace balcony. Louis's behaviour during the noisy flypast was widely commented on in the media as being excited and amusing, with videos of his behaviour going viral on social media. A few days later on 5 June, Louis attended the Platinum Jubilee Pageant with his parents and siblings, where he again attracted media attention for his excited antics. Following the pageant he joined his parents, elder siblings, Elizabeth II, and the then Prince of Wales and Duchess of Cornwall on the Buckingham Palace balcony.

Title and style
Louis is a British prince with the official style and title "His Royal Highness Prince Louis of Wales". Before his father was created Prince of Wales on 9 September 2022, Louis was styled "His Royal Highness Prince Louis of Cambridge".

Succession 
Prince Louis is fourth in the line of succession to the British throne, behind his father and older siblings, Prince George and Princess Charlotte. Following the implementation of the Perth Agreement, which replaced male-preference primogeniture with absolute primogeniture, he is the first British prince to be ranked behind an elder sister in the line of succession.

See also
Family tree of the British royal family
List of living British princes and princesses

Notes

References

External links
Prince Louis at the Royal Family website

2018 births
Living people
21st-century British people
Children of William, Prince of Wales
English children
English people of Danish descent
English people of German descent
English people of Greek descent
English people of Russian descent
English people of Scottish descent
Family of Charles III
House of Windsor
Middleton family (British)
Mountbatten-Windsor family
People from London
Princes of the United Kingdom
Royal children
British princes
Younger sons of dukes